This is a list of things named after Albert Einstein.

Scientific and mathematical concepts

Technology
 Einstein refrigerator
 Tatung Einstein, an eight-bit home/personal computer
 Einstein Observatory, the first fully imaging X-ray telescope
 Einstein Telescope, a future third generation gravitational wave detector
 Albert Einstein ATV, a European unmanned cargo resupply spacecraft

Schools

Streets

 Einsteinova ulica, a major road in Bratislava, Slovakia
 Einsteinova, a street in Prague, Czech Republic
 Einsteinova, a street in Olomouc, Czech Republic
 Einsteinova, a street in Karviná, Czech Republic
 Einsteinstraße, Munich, Germany
 Albert Einstein Straße, Göttingen, Germany
 Albert-Einstein-Allee, Ulm, Germany
 Albert Einstein Street in Coimbra, Portugal
 Einstein Street, Tel Aviv, Israel
 Einstein Street, Haifa, Israel
 Albert Einstein Square, Jerusalem Israel
Einstein St. in Norman, Oklahoma is named in his honor.
 Albert-Einstein Boulevard, city of Châteauguay, Quebec, Canada
Albert-Einstein Street, city of Gatineau, Québec, Canada
Avenida Einstein, Santiago de Chile

Buildings
 Albert Einstein Hospital in São Paulo, Brazil
 Albert Einstein Medical Center, Philadelphia, Pennsylvania
 Einstein metro station, on the Santiago Metro, in Santiago, Chile
 Einstein Tower, astrophysical observatory in the Albert Einstein Science Park in Potsdam, Germany
 Albert Einstein House, a National Historic Landmark in Princeton, New Jersey

Arts and entertainment

Awards
 Albert Einstein World Award of Science, a yearly award given by the World Cultural Council
 Albert Einstein Award, an award in theoretical physics endowed by the Lewis and Rosa Strauss Memorial Fund 
 Albert Einstein Medal, presented by the Albert Einstein Society in Bern, Switzerland, to people who have "rendered outstanding services" in connection with Albert Einstein, since 1979
 Einstein Prize for Laser Science, international physics award
 Einstein Prize (APS), a biennial prize, awarded by the American Physical Society since 2003

Other

See also
 Albert Einstein in popular culture

Named after
Society-related lists
Lists of things named after physicists